Hand in Hand is a 1961 British drama film about the friendship between two young children, one a Roman Catholic boy about nine, the other a 7-year-old Jewish girl.

Filmed in the summer of 1960 under the title "The Star and the Cross", Hand in Hand. Although ABPC's distribution arm in the United Kingdom, Warner-Pathe Film Distributors, screened the film for the British press in late 1960, it remained unreleased in the UK until 1963, when it finally went out nationally on the ABC cinema circuit as the supporting feature for the Tony Hancock comedy The Punch and Judy Man. It was shown to American children and adults when released on the CBS Children's Film Festival 1967 season hosted by Kukla, Fran and Ollie.

Plot
Michael O'Malley (Needs), rushes to his priest to tearfully inform him that he has accidentally killed his closest friend, Rachel Mathias (Parry). The story is told in flashback as Michael recounts their friendship, when he first befriended Rachel by hurrying her away from a group of schoolboys who were verbally bullying her on the playground. They quickly become the best of friends. The young children decide to become "blood brothers" by pricking their fingers and rubbing the blood together. They set off for an adventure, hoping to go to London to visit the queen, but instead are picked up by a kindly elderly lady (Sybil Thorndike) who takes them to her home for tea, pretending that she is a princess and that her mansion is one of the queen's homes, but that the queen is currently away. Her amiable deception goes over perfectly, and the children have a great time visiting with her.

Michael and Rachel are aware that they worship on different days and their religions are somewhat different, but they do not ponder the specifics. However, when a somewhat overbearing and destructively-outspoken classmate informs Michael that Rachel is Jewish and that "the Jews killed Christ", an outraged Michael rushes to Rachel at their clubhouse and angrily confronts her, "Why did you kill Christ?" Rachel is shocked and insistently denies it: "I didn't kill him. I don't even know him". Michael and Rachel conclude that God is angry at them for becoming friends, but they are not sure if He will forgive them. They decide to attend church with each other to see if God is mad at them, believing they will die if He does not want them to go to each other's church. Michael sneaks into the synagogue with Rachel the next Saturday and is somewhat puzzled and intimidated by the ceremony, but he stays and seems to like it as time goes on, especially after the kindly rabbi shows him a passage in the Torah that speaks of God's love shielding him from all fear. The next day, Rachel goes with Michael to his church, and while Rachel is initially somewhat unnerved by the services and statues, she too feels more comfortable after a while, especially as the Blessed Virgin's gentle expression appeals to her: "It's all right, Mike. The lady likes me."

Having concluded it is acceptable to God that they remain friends, Michael and Rachel decide to take an inflatable raft on the  River Thames for their next adventure, a trip to Africa. All goes well at first as Michael paddles and the raft drifts leisurely and makes smooth ripples on the calm water, but then when the duo passes into a dangerous section of the river with a swifter flow and strong rapids, Michael loses control of the raft, and Rachel is knocked overboard. Due to the stronger current and the riverbank's dense underbrush in which Rachel has become entangled, Michael has great difficulty reaching her, but at last pulls her out of the river; however, she is limp and unresponsive. Fearing the worst, Michael frantically rushes to get help, and adults in the area call for an ambulance. The film then returns to the present moment, with Michael in his grief-stricken state, and telling the priest that he's killed Rachel. The priest comforts him and tells him that Rachel may be all right, and then accompanies him to Rachel's home to see how she is. They are met at the front door by Rachel's rabbi who is leaving, and he smilingly informs them that Rachel has pulled through after all and is recovering well, but that perhaps it would be better to wait till tomorrow to visit her. Michael, immensely relieved, rushes home happy that his little friend is still alive, and the priest and the rabbi --- who earlier in the film have been established as being good friends despite their differing religions (just as the Catholic boy Michael and Jewish girl Rachel had become close), and acknowledging that their respective religions actually hold more in common than they may have realized before --- speak warmly to each other before walking away in different directions.

Cast
 Philip Needs as Michael O'Malley
 Loretta Parry as Rachel Mathias
 John Gregson as Father Timothy
 Sybil Thorndike as Lady Caroline
 Finlay Currie as Mr. Pritchard
 Miriam Karlin as Mrs. Mathias
 Arnold Diamond as Mr. Mathias
 Barbara Hicks as Miss Roberts
 Derek Sydney as Rabbi Benjamin
 Denis Gilmore as Tom
 Kathleen Byron as Mrs. O'Malley
 Barry Keegan as Mr. O'Malley

Awards and nominations
The film won 14 international film awards including a special Golden Globe Award for Best Film Promoting International Understanding and the children’s category at the Venice Film Festival. Director Philip Leacock was also a top 20 finalist among 1961 theatrical motion pictures for Best Achievement in Directing by the Directors Guild of America.

Directors Guild of America
 1962: Nominated, Outstanding Directorial Achievement in Motion Pictures – Philip Leacock

Golden Globe Award
 1961: Won, Best Film Promoting International Understanding

External links
 
 

British black-and-white films
Christian and Jewish interfaith dialogue
Films shot at Associated British Studios
1960s English-language films
Films directed by Philip Leacock
Catholicism and Judaism
Films about Jews and Judaism
Films about Catholicism